Yang Hyo-Jin (Hangul: 양효진, Hanja: 梁孝眞; born 14 December 1989) is a South Korean volleyball player. She currently plays for the Korean club  Hyundai Engineering & Construction Hillstate. She is a former member of the South Korea women's national volleyball team which placed fourth in the 2012 Summer Olympics and 2020 Summer Olympics and fifth in the 2016 Summer Olympics.

She retired from the South Korea women's national volleyball team after playing at the 2020 Summer Olympics.

Club career 
  Hyundai Engineering & Construction Hillstate (2007–)

Team 

Korean V-League
 Champion (2): 2010–11, 2015–16
 Runners-up (2): 2009–10, 2011–12
KOVO Cup
 Champion (2): 2014, 2019
 Runners-up (3): 2009, 2013, 2015

Individuals 
Korean V-League Final "Most Valuable Player" (1): 2015–16
Korean V-League "Most Valuable Player" (1): 2019-20
Korean V-League "Best Blocker" (5): 2009–10, 2010–11, 2011–12, 2012–13, 2013–14
Korean V-League "Best Spiker" (1): 2013–14
Korean V-League "Best 7" (7): 2014–15, 2015–16, 2016–17, 2017–18, 2018–19, 2019–20, 2020–21
Korean V-League "MVP of the Month" (1): 2009–10 February
Korean V-League "MVP of the Round" (6): 2011–12 4R, 2012–13 3R, 2012–13 4R, 2015–16 2R, 3R, 2019-20 4R

International career

National Team 
Summer Olympics
2012 – 4th Place
2016 – 5th Place
2020 – 4th Place
FIVB World Championship
2010 – 13th
2018 – 17th
FIVB World Cup
2015 – 6th 
2019 – 6th 
FIVB Volleyball Nations League
2018 – 12th 
2021 – 15th Place
FIVB World Grand Prix
2009 – 12th 
2012 – 14th 
2014 – 8th 
2017 – 14th 
FIVB World Grand Champions Cup
2009 – 5th 
Asian Games
2010 –  2nd
2014 –  1st
2018 –  3rd
Asian Championship
2009 – 4th 
2013 –  3rd
2015 –  2nd
2017 –  3rd
2019 –  3rd
AVC Cup
2008 –  2nd
 2010 –  3rd
2012 – 6th
 2014 –  2nd

Individuals
 2009 FIVB World Grand Champions Cup – "Best Blocker"
2010 AVC Asian Cup – "Best Blocker"
2012 FIVB World Olympic Qualification Tournament – "Best Middle Blocker"
2014 AVC Asian Cup – "Best Middle Blocker"
2016 FIVB World Olympic Qualification Tournament – "Best Middle Blocker"

References

External links
 KOVO profile

1989 births
South Korean women's volleyball players
Living people
Asian Games medalists in volleyball
Volleyball players at the 2010 Asian Games
Volleyball players at the 2014 Asian Games
Volleyball players at the 2018 Asian Games
Volleyball players at the 2012 Summer Olympics
Olympic volleyball players of South Korea
Volleyball players at the 2016 Summer Olympics
Medalists at the 2010 Asian Games
Medalists at the 2014 Asian Games
Medalists at the 2018 Asian Games
Asian Games gold medalists for South Korea
Asian Games silver medalists for South Korea
Asian Games bronze medalists for South Korea
South Korean Buddhists
Volleyball players at the 2020 Summer Olympics
Sportspeople from Busan